Pham Huu Tiep is a Vietnamese American mathematician specializing in group theory and representation theory.  He is currently a Joshua Barlaz Distinguished Professor of Mathematics at Rutgers University.

Pham Tiep graduated from Chu Văn An High School, and received a silver medal at the IMO in London in 1979. He received his Ph.D. at Moscow University in 1988 under supervision of Alexei Kostrikin. He gave an invited talk at the International Congress of Mathematicians in Rio de Janeiro in 2018. He is a Fellow of the American Mathematical Society, 
a Clay Institute Senior Scholar, and a Simons Fellow.

Pham Tiep was the fifth Vietnamese mathematician invited to speak at the International Congress of Mathematicians, following Frédéric Pham (1970), Duong Hong Phong (1994), Ngô Bảo Châu (2006, 2010) and Van H. Vu (2014).

Selected papers
 2018: "Character bounds for finite groups of Lie type", Acta Math. 221 (2018), 1 - 57 (with Roman Bezrukavnikov, Martin Liebeck, and Aner Shalev)
 2016: "The alpha-invariant and Thompson's conjecture", Forum Math. Pi 4 (2016), e5, 28 pages
 2013: "Characters of relative p'-degree over normal subgroups", Annals of Math. 178 (2013), 1135 - 1171 (with Gabriel Navarro)
 2011: "Waring problem for finite simple groups", Annals of Math. 174 (2011), 1885 - 1950 (with Michael Larsen and Aner Shalev)
 2011: "A reduction theorem for the Alperin weight conjecture", Invent. Math. 184 (2011), 529 - 565 (with Gabriel Navarro)
 2010: "The Ore conjecture", Journal of the European Mathematical Society (with Martin Liebeck, EA O'Brien, Aner Shalev)
 2008: "Symmetric powers and a problem of Kollar and Larsen", Invent. Math. 174 (2008), 505 - 554 (with Robert M. Guralnick)

References

External links
 Pham Tiep's Rutgers Web page
Pham Huu Tiep page at Clay Institute

Living people
Rutgers University faculty
21st-century American mathematicians
20th-century Vietnamese  mathematicians
People from Hanoi
Vietnamese emigrants to the United States
Moscow State University alumni
Fellows of the American Mathematical Society
Year of birth missing (living people)